Carole Bureau-Bonnard (born 9 August 1965) is a French kinesiotherapist and politician of La République En Marche! (LREM) who was elected to the French National Assembly on 18 June 2017, representing the department of Oise.

Political career
Having previously been active for the Socialist Party, Bureau-Bonnard joined LREM in 2017.

In parliament, Bureau-Bonnard has been a member of the Defence Committee since 2017. From 2017 until 2019, she served as one of six vice-presidents of the National Assembly, under the leadership of president Richard Ferrand. In this capacity, she was in charge of the parliament's international activities.

Political positions
In July 2019, Bureau-Bonnard voted in favour of the French ratification of the European Union’s Comprehensive Economic and Trade Agreement (CETA) with Canada.

Controversy
In 2019, Bureau-Bonnard's office in Noyon was vandalized during anti-government protests of the Yellow vests movement.

See also
 2017 French legislative election

References

1965 births
Living people
People from La Fère
Deputies of the 15th National Assembly of the French Fifth Republic
La République En Marche! politicians
21st-century French women politicians
Women members of the National Assembly (France)